Radio International (in Persian: رادیو انترناسیونال) was a radio station in Persian which acted against the current Islamic Republic of Iran. Although it represented itself as “independent”, it is a de facto organ of the Worker-communist Party of Iran. 

The slogan of Radio International was “Voice of Liberty, Voice of Worker, Voice of Truth, and Voice of Humanity”.

This radio was broadcasting from Sweden and covers all of Iran, even though it was obviously banned in Iran.

The director of radio was Siavash Daneshvar and some notable staff include Sima Bahari, Sadegh Zandi, and Soosan Saberi.

International broadcasters